Leonardo José Aparecido Moura (born 9 March 1986), simply known as Leonardo,  is a Brazilian retired footballer who played as a central defender.

Club career
Leonardo was born in Guarulhos, São Paulo, and joined Santos' youth setup in 1998, aged 12. He was promoted to the main squad in 2004, and made his first team – and Série A – debut on 16 October, starting in a 4–0 home win against Ponte Preta.

On 22 July 2005 Leonardo signed a five-year contract with Shakhtar Donetsk, for a $1.8 million fee. Despite being regularly used, mainly in the 2006–07 campaign, he was shown the door by the club due to the new rules of the league.

Leonardo was loaned to Santos in February 2007, but after struggling with fitness, moved to São Caetano in March 2008 also in a temporary deal. He was more utilized during his spell at the latter,

On 9 February 2009 Leonardo was again loaned, this time to Vasco da Gama. On 18 June, after appearing rarely with the side, he returned to Shakhtar, being used only as a backup during the season.

Leonardo was subsequently loaned to Grêmio Prudente, Avaí and Atlético Goianiense, signing permanently with the latter in 2012.

On 18 June 2013 Leonardo joined Criciúma, He subsequently represented Ponte Preta, Bragantino and Ituano, all in his native state.

On 15 May 2015 Leonardo returned to Santos, signing until the end of 2016. On 6 January of the following year, after being rarely used, he rescinded his link, and joined Mersin İdmanyurdu a day later.

After only one league game in the 2018/19 season, Leonardos contract was terminated by mutual consent.

International career
After representing Brazil in the under-17 and under-20 levels, Leonardo was called up to the main squad by manager Carlos Alberto Parreira on 18 April 2005, for a friendly against Guatemala. However, he did not play the match.

Career statistics

Honours

Club
Santos
Campeonato Brasileiro Série A: 2004
Campeonato Paulista: 2007

Shakhtar Donetsk
Ukrainian Premier League: 2005–06

Atlético Goianiense
Campeonato Goiano: 2011, 2013

International
Brazil U17
FIFA U-17 World Cup: 2003

References

External links
 

1986 births
Living people
People from Guarulhos
Brazilian footballers
Association football defenders
Campeonato Brasileiro Série A players
Campeonato Brasileiro Série B players
Santos FC players
Associação Desportiva São Caetano players
CR Vasco da Gama players
Grêmio Barueri Futebol players
Avaí FC players
Atlético Clube Goianiense players
Criciúma Esporte Clube players
Associação Atlética Ponte Preta players
Clube Atlético Bragantino players
Ituano FC players
Santa Cruz Futebol Clube players
Ukrainian Premier League players
FC Shakhtar Donetsk players
Mersin İdman Yurdu footballers
Brazil youth international footballers
Brazil under-20 international footballers
Brazilian expatriate footballers
Expatriate footballers in Ukraine
Brazilian expatriate sportspeople in Ukraine
Expatriate footballers in Turkey
Brazilian expatriate sportspeople in Turkey
Footballers from São Paulo (state)